Patricia Scott is a senior Australian public servant and policymaker. In her time as Secretary of the Department of Broadband, Communications and the Digital Economy she was responsible for rolling out the first stages of the Australian Government's $40-plus billion National Broadband Network.

Public service career
Scott joined the Australian Public Service in 1990.

John Howard appointed Patricia Scott as Secretary of the new Department of Human Services in 2004. She was instrumental establishing the new department.

In May 2007 Scott was appointed to lead the Department of Communications, Information Technology and the Arts. When the Rudd Government was elected in 2007, Scott continued her appointment as Secretary of the communications department, which was renamed to the Department of Broadband, Communications and the Digital Economy (DBCDE). In DBCDE she was responsible for rolling out the Government's $40-plus billion national broadband network.

After leaving her position in DBCDE in 2009, Scott moved to a role as a Commissioner of the Productivity Commission. In 2011 she headed a Productivity Commission inquiry into the feasibility of a National Disability Insurance Scheme, concluding that the Australian Government should take action to provide reasonable support services for people with a disability.

Notes

References and further reading

Australian public servants
Living people
Australian National University alumni
Macquarie University alumni
Year of birth missing (living people)